"María", is a 1945 tango written by Aníbal Troilo with lyrics by Cátulo Castillo, and first sung by Alberto Marino in the same year.
 It was among the tango standards selected by Plácido Domingo for his 1981 album Plácido Domingo Sings Tangos.

References

1945 songs
Argentine songs
Tangos